William Chaytor may refer to:

Sir William Chaytor, 1st Baronet (1639–1721), of the Chaytor baronets
William Chaytor (MP) (1732–1819), MP for Hedon
Sir William Chaytor, 1st Baronet (1771–1847), son of the above
Sir William Chaytor, 2nd Baronet (1805–1871), son of the above
Sir William Chaytor, 3rd Baronet (1837–1896), son of the above, of the Chaytor baronets
Sir William Chaytor, 4th Baronet (1867–1908), son of the above, of the Chaytor baronets
Sir William Chaytor, 7th Baronet (1914–1976), of the Chaytor baronets

See also
Chaytor (surname)